DYRC (648 AM) Aksyon Radyo is a radio station owned and operated by Manila Broadcasting Company. It serves as the flagship radio station of MBC's regional AM network Aksyon Radyo. The station's studio is located at 2nd Floor, GD Uyfang Bldg., Sanciangko cor. Panganiban, St., Brgy. Pahina Central, Cebu City, and its transmitter is located at Brgy. Tangke, Talisay, Cebu.

History
The origins of Aksyon Radyo can be traced to the original DYRC, first known as KZRC on January 7, 1929, by the Radio Corporation of the Philippines, then was sold to Isaac Beck. In 1940, the Heacock Company bought KZRC, and became a sister station to KZRH (now DZRH) Manila.

After World War II, the Elizalde family bought all Heacock stations. This gave birth to the Manila Broadcasting Company.

KZRC became DYRC after Philippine independence, through MBC's subsidiary Cebu Broadcasting Company. DYRC was the pioneer AM station in Genie Peralta Vaminta and Henry Halasan topped the bill in prime time broadcasting. Some famous personalities aired on DYRC were Nene Pimentel, Former Cong. Tony Cuenco, Asia's Queen of Songs Pilita Corrales, veteran broadcaster Angelo Castro Sr., Former DILG Secretary Inday Nita Cortez Daluz, Arch. Angel Lagdameo, lawyer Jane Paredes, among others. Star Cebuano singers featured in DYRC were: Josie Lauron, Josephine Ferrer, Stacs Huguete, and child singer Amapola Cabase popularly known as Amapola, to name a few. Bandleaders and pianists leading the DYRC-DYBU bands were Emilio Villareal and Manny Cabase.

On January 4, 1999, Padayon Pilipino Media Consultancy Services Inc. took over the management of the station and changed its call sign to DYXR. This marks the birth of Aksyon Radyo. Back then, its studios were located at Brgy. Tangke, Talisay, Cebu.

On September 21, 2010, BisaLog Broadcasting (owned by lawyer/host Rhina Seco, DZRH-Aksyon Radyo News Bureau Manila's Niño Padilla, and Aksyon Radyo Program Director Ed Montilla) took over the management of the station and brought back its original callsign DYRC as part of its 70th anniversary. It moved to Unit 301 Doña Luisa Building, Fuente Osmeña. At the same time, DYRC launched "Dangpanan", the local version of DZRH's "Operation Tulong" that offers free medical, dental and legal services to the needy; as well as a music format on Sundays. Prior to its relaunch, the station went off the air in August 2010 and Padayon Pilipino's management revived its operations in the United States as the US News Buraeu of Aksyon Radyo.

In the wake of the canonization of Pedro Calungsod in 2012, DYRC adopted a temporary branding Radyo Calungsod.

In May 2018, Manila Broadcasting Company took over the operations of DYRC with Atty. Rudolph Steve E Jularbal as its Station Manager (who also happens to be the station manager of DYRC's parent station, DZRH). Just recently, the station moved to its current studios in GD Uyfang Building. The present DYRC Station OIC is Rodolfo "Dodie, Dr LOVE" Ladrera Jr.

On November 15, 2021, Aksyon Radyo along with sister stations launched their new logos and its new corporate slogan, Sama-Sama Tayo, Pilipino! (lit. We are all Filipinos!).

References

See also
 Aksyon Radyo U.S. - the former Aksyon Radyo Cebu.

Radio stations in Metro Cebu
Radio stations established in 1929